Ikhtiyār al-Dīn Muḥammad Bakhtiyār Khaljī, (Pashto :اختيار الدين محمد بختيار غلزۍ) also known as Bakhtiyar Khalji, was a Turko-Afghan military general of the Ghurid ruler Muhammad of Ghor, who led the Muslim conquests of the eastern Indian regions of Bengal and Bihar and established himself as their ruler. He was the founder of the Khalji dynasty of Bengal, which ruled Bengal for a short period, from 1203 to 1227 CE.

Khalji's invasions of the Indian subcontinent between A.D. 1197 and 1206 led to mass flight and massacres of Buddhist monks, and caused grave damage to the traditional Buddhist institutions of higher learning in Northern India. In Bengal, Khalji's reign was responsible for displacement of Buddhism by Islam. His rule is said to have begun the Islamic rule in Bengal, most notably those of Bengal Sultanate and Mughal Bengal.

Bakhtiyar launched an ill-fated Tibet campaign in 1206 and was assassinated upon returning to Bengal by Ali Mardan. He was succeeded by Muhammad Shiran Khalji.

Early life
Bakhtiyar Khalji was born and raised in Garmsir, Helmand, in present-day southern Afghanistan. He was member of the Khalaj tribe,  which is of Turkic origin and after being settled in south-eastern Afghanistan for over 200 years, eventually led to the creation of the Ghilji tribe. 

Bakhtiyar during his early years went in search of employment to Ghazni and Delhi, although he was rejected there due to his ugly appearance. Afterwards, he move towards Badaun in present-day Uttar Pradesh, where the Ghurid governor Hizabrudin Hasan Adib took Bakhtiyar in his service and thus, he got his first assignment. A slightly different account of 14th century chronicler Abdul Malik Isami states that Bakhtiyar's first employment was in the service of a Rajput ruler Jaitra Singh. The account of Isami is not attested by the earlier authorities and is unlikely to be true considering the hostility between the two in later twelfth century. While, there were instances of Afghan soldiers fighting in the Rajput forces as attested by a later chronicler Ferishta as well, still the account of Isami regarding Bakhtiyar's first assignment is largely unreliable and dubious.

Bakhtiyar did not come from an obscure background. His uncle Muhammad bin Mahmud Khalji was a lieutenant of the Ghurid ruler Muhammad of Ghor and according to chronicler Minhaj-i-Siraj fought valiantly in the Second Battle of Tarain against Chahamana ruler Prithviraja III where the Ghurids secured a decisive victory. Mahmud was later honoured with the iqta of Kashamandi for his gallantry in Tarain. After the death of his uncle, the iqta was passed to Bakhtiyar. However, Bakhtiyar did not stay in Kashamndi for long and approached the commander of Benaras Husamudin Aghul Bek who was impressed with his gallantry and bestowed on him the iqta of Bhagwat and Bhilui. ( present-day Mirzapur district)

In his early career before the expeditions in Bengal and Bihar, Bakhtiyar displaced the minor Gahadavala chiefs in the region of present-day Uttar Pradesh  and from there raided Maner and Bihar where he looted a large amount of booty. These successful neighbouring raids increased Bakhtiyar's fame and several Khalji emir joined in his service. At the same time, Muhammad of Ghor's slave Qutb ud-Din Aibak also honoured him.

Conquest of Bengal 
Khalji was head of the Ghurid Empire military force that conquered parts of eastern India at the end of the 12th century and at the beginning of the 13th century.

He subjugated Bihar in 1200. His invasions severely damaged the Buddhist establishments at Odantapuri, Vikramashila, and destroyed Nalanda University. Minhaj-i-Siraj Juzjani's Tabaqat-i Nasiri documents Bakhtiyar Khalji's sack of a Buddhist monastery, which the author equates in his description with a city he calls "Bihar", from the soldiers' use of the word vihara. According to the early 17th-century Buddhist scholar Taranatha, the invaders massacred many monks at Odantapuri, and destroyed Vikramashila.

In 1203, Khalji took his forces into Bengal. With the octogenarian emperor Lakshmana Sena at the helm, Sena dynasty was in a state of decline, and could not provide much resistance. As Khalji came upon the city of Nabadwip, it is said that he advanced so rapidly that only 18 horsemen from his army could keep up. The small horde entered the city unchallenged and took the emperor and his army by shock . This caused Lakhsmana Sena to flee with his retainers to east Bengal. Khalji subsequently went on to capture Gauda (ancient Lakhnauti), the capital and the principal city of Bengal and intruded into much of Bengal.

Muhammad Bakhtiyar's rule was related by Minhaj al-Siraj, as he visited Bengal about 40 years later:

Death and aftermath

Ikhtiyar al-Dīn Muḥammad Khalji left the town of Devkot in 1206 to attack Tibet, leaving Ali Mardan Khalji in Ghoraghat Upazila to guard the eastern frontier from his headquarters at Barisal. Bakhtiyar Khalji's forces suffered a disastrous defeat at the hands of Tibetan guerrilla forces at Chumbi Valley, which forced him to retreat to Devkot with only about a hundred surviving soldiers. As he lay ill and exhausted in Devkot, Bakhtiyar Khalji was assassinated by Ali Mardan Khalji.

The Khalji noblemen then appointed Muhammad Shiran Khalji as Bakhtiyar's successor. Loyal troops under Shiran Khalji and Subedar Aulia Khan avenged Ikhtiyar's death, imprisoning Ali Mardan Khalji. Eventually Ali Mardan fled to Delhi and provoked the Sultan of Delhi Qutb al-Din Aibak to invade Bengal, who sent an army under Qayemaz Rumi, the governor of Awadh, to dethrone Shiran Khalji . Shiran fled to Dinajpur where he later died. Ghiyas-ud-din Iwaz Khalji assisted the invasion and assumed the governorship of Bengal in 1208. But shortly after, he yielded power to Ali Mardan willingly, when the latter returned from Delhi in 1210. However, the nobles of Bengal conspired against and assassinated Ali Mardan in 1212. Iwaj Khalji assumed power again and proclaimed his independence from the Delhi sultanate.

Legacy 
Muhammad Bakhtiyar Khalji had the Khutbah read and coins struck in his name. Mosques, madrasas, and khanqahs arose in the new abode of Islam through Bakhtiyar's patronage, and his example was imitated by his subordinates. Khalji's conquest began nearly 600 years of Muslim rule over Bengal which ended when British East India company took complete control of Bengal between 1772 to 1793.

See also
 List of rulers of Bengal#Delhi Sultanate era
 Sultan Mahmud Ghaznavi
 Ghazi Saiyyad Salar Masud
 Bakhtiarpur

References

Bibliography

External links

 History of the Muslims of Bengal – Volume 1A: Muslim Rule in Bengal (600-170/1203-1757), by Muhammad Mohar Ali, Imam Muhammad ibn Saud Islamic University, Department of Culture and Publications.
 
 

Mamluk dynasty (Delhi)
Medieval India
Rulers of Bengal
1206 deaths
12th-century Indian monarchs
Indian Muslims
Year of birth unknown
Buddhism and Islam
Indian people of Turkic descent
Founding monarchs
Murdered monarchs